Francis George Parks (March 1875 – 22 May 1945) was a British amateur heavyweight boxer. He joined the Polytechnic Boxing Club in 1892, and won the Studd Trophy in 1902. He also won a bronze medal at the 1908 Summer Olympics.

Biography
He was born in March 1875 in London, England, to George Parks and Eliza Ann Barrington. Around 1896 he married Ada Sarah Waller in London and they had the following children: Maud Lilian Parks (1897–1983), Francis George Parks (1898–?); Rose Gladys Parks (1900–?), Ivy Mary Parks (1904–?), and Olive Eva Parks (1907–1991). He was the ABA Heavyweight Champion in 1899, 1901, 1902, 1905 and 1906.

In 1911 he and Reuben Charles Warnes went to the United States with the Amateur Boxing Association of England to fight in Madison Square Garden in a series of exhibition bouts. In one of the 1911 matches in the United States he lost to William Spengler in three rounds on a referee's decision.

He died on 22 May 1945 in Hampstead, in a car crash.

Championships
Amateur Boxing Association of England heavyweight championships in 1899, 1901, 1902, 1905 and 1906.
French Boxing Championship in 1905.

Legacy
A plaque in the shape of a laurel wreath was dedicated to Frank Parks by the Polytechnic Boxing Club "as a token of admiration by his many friends for his high example and untiring effort for the welfare of  club for 52 years". The plaque is dated 7 November 1946.

See also 
Manifest with Frank Parks arriving in United States
Back of manifest with Frank Parks arriving in United States

References

External links

Heavyweight boxers
1875 births
Polytechnic Boxing Club
1945 deaths
England Boxing champions
Olympic bronze medallists for Great Britain
Boxers at the 1908 Summer Olympics
English male boxers
Road incident deaths in London